Carlos Antonio Carrillo (24 December 1783 – 23 February 1852) was a Californio politician, military officer, and ranchero. He was nominated to serve as Governor of Alta California from 1837–38, in opposition to Juan Bautista Alvarado's rule.  However, after failing to subdue Alvarado, Carrillo relinquished his claim to the governorship to Alvarado in 1838.

Early life
Carrillo was a member of the Carrillo family of California, a prominent Californio family, one of the first children born at the Presidio of Santa Barbara (established 1782). His father, José Raimundo Carrillo, was a soldier who came north with the Portolá expedition in 1769 and served at the Presidio of Santa Barbara for twelve years.

From 1797 to 1825 Carlos Antonio served in the military at Monterey and Santa Barbara. As Alta California's delegate to the Mexican Congress of the Union, Carrillo pursued Alta California judicial reform, but his ideas were rejected.
In 1836, Carrillo joined the rebellious Juan Bautista Alvarado in demanding a more autonomous Alta California, but internal dissension doomed the effort. In 1837, Carlos was appointed to replace Alvarado as governor, but Alvarado was able to reclaim the Governorship a year later.

Mexican land grant - Channel Islands
The Spanish Empire had conquered California, Arizona, New Mexico and Texas from the American Indian tribes over the preceding three centuries, but there remained powerful and independent indigenous nations within that northern regiono. Most of that land was too dry (low rainfall) and too mountainous to support many people, until the advent of new technology after about 1880: means for damming and distributing water from the few rivers to irrigated farmland; the telegraph; the railroad; the telephone; and electrical power.

About only 80,000 Mexicans inhabited California, New Mexico, Arizona, and Texas during the period 1845 to 1850, with far fewer in Nevada, southern and western Colorado, and Utah. On 1 March 1845, U.S. President John Tyler signed legislation to authorize the United States to annex the Republic of Texas, effective on 29 December 1845. The Mexican government, which had never recognized the Republic of Texas as an independent country, had warned that annexation would be viewed as an act of war. The United Kingdom and France, both of which recognized the independence of the Republic of Texas, repeatedly tried to dissuade Mexico from declaring war against its northern neighbor. British efforts to mediate the quandary proved fruitless, in part because additional political disputes (particularly the Oregon boundary dispute) arose between Great Britain (as the claimant of modern Canada) and the United States. The Spanish Empire had given Mexico this area on Spanish Land grants.

Governor Manuel Micheltorena gave a Mexican land grant of Santa Rosa Island, in the Channel Islands of California, to Carlos and his brother José Antonio Carrillo in 1843. They later gave the island to Carlos' daughters, Manuela Carrillo  Jones and Francisca Carrillo Thompson.

The Treaty of Guadalupe Hidalgo (Tratado de Guadalupe Hidalgo in Spanish), officially titled the Treaty of Peace, Friendship, Limits and Settlement between the United States of America and the Mexican Republic, is the peace treaty signed on February 2, 1848, in the Villa de Guadalupe Hidalgo (now a neighborhood of Mexico City) between the United States and Mexico that ended the Mexican–American War (1846–1848). The treaty came into force on July 4, 1848.

With the defeat of its army and the fall of its capital, Mexico entered into negotiations to end the war. The treaty called for the U.S. to pay US$15 million to Mexico and to pay off the claims of American citizens against Mexico up to US$5 million. It gave the United States the Rio Grande as a boundary for Texas, and gave the U.S. ownership of California and a large area comprising roughly half of New Mexico, most of Arizona, Nevada, and Utah and Colorado. Mexicans in those annexed areas had the choice of relocating to within Mexico's new boundaries or receiving American citizenship with full civil rights.

The U.S. Senate advised and consented to ratification of the treaty by a vote of 38–14. The opponents of this treaty were led by the Whigs, who had opposed the war and rejected manifest destiny in general, and rejected this expansion in particular. The amount of land gained by the United States from Mexico was further increased as a result of the Gadsden Purchase of 1853, which ceded parts of present-day southern Arizona and New Mexico to the United States of America.

Relatives
 Brother of José Antonio Carrillo (1796–1862)
 Father of Maria Josefa Carrillo, who married Captain William Goodwin Dana
 Father of Maria Encarnation Carrillo, who married Captain Thomas M. Robbins
 Grandfather of Juan José Carrillo (1842–1916)
 Great grandfather of Leo Carrillo (1880–1961)
 Father of Josef Gertrudis Carrillo 1810-1871, married three times 
 Father of Maria Francisca Carrillo 1816-1841, who married Alpheus B Thompson 1798-1869 
 Father of Pedro Catarino Carrillo 1817-1885, who married Maria Josefa Bandini 1821-1896 
 Father of Manuela Antonia Carrillo 1810-1885, who married John Coffin Jones 1790-1850
 Father of Maria Antonia Carrillo 1822-1843, who married Luis T Burton 1812-1879 
 Father of Jose De Jesus Carrillo 1824-1864, married two times.  
 Father of Maria Tomasa Carrillo 1827-1851 who married Luis T Burton 1812-1879 
 Father of Maria Edwiges Carrillo 1829-Unknown

References

Californios
Governors of Mexican California
Land owners from California
1783 births
1852 deaths
American people of Spanish descent
American politicians of Mexican descent
19th-century American politicians
19th-century American businesspeople